Mohammad Kamran Hussain (born May 9, 1977) is a Pakistani international cricketer who has played two One Day Internationals, as well as playing first-class, List A and Twenty20 cricket for eight teams in Pakistani domestic cricket.

External links
Cricinfo profile of Kamran Hussain

Pakistani cricketers
Pakistan One Day International cricketers
Bahawalpur cricketers
Water and Power Development Authority cricketers
Pakistan Customs cricketers
Multan cricketers
Baluchistan cricketers
Habib Bank Limited cricketers
Baluchistan Bears cricketers
1977 births
Living people
Cricketers from Bahawalpur
South Asian Games bronze medalists for Pakistan
South Asian Games medalists in cricket